Noel Niemann (born 14 November 1999) is a German professional footballer who plays as a right winger for  club VfL Osnabrück.

Career
Born in Munich, Niemann started playing football with local SV 1880 München. In June 2020, Munich-based blog sechzger.de reported Niemann would not renew his expiring contract at 3. Liga club 1860 Munich and had instead signed for Arminia Bielefeld, who at the time were leading the table of the 2. Bundesliga. In July 2020, Arminia Bielefeld confirmed the move. Niemann signed a contract until summer 2024.

On 30 August 2022, Niemann signed with VfL Osnabrück.

Personal life
Niemann was born in Germany and is of Afghan and Liberian descent.

References

Living people
1999 births
German people of Afghan descent
German people of Liberian descent
Sportspeople of Liberian descent
German footballers
Footballers from Munich
Association football midfielders
2. Bundesliga players
3. Liga players
Austrian Football Bundesliga players
TSV 1860 Munich II players
TSV 1860 Munich players
Arminia Bielefeld players
Türkgücü München players
TSV Hartberg players
VfL Osnabrück players
German expatriate footballers
German expatriate sportspeople in Austria
Expatriate footballers in Austria